The Mayor of Tehran is an elected politician who, along with the City Council of 21 members, is accountable for the strategic government of Tehran. Since 2 September 2021, Alireza Zakani is the mayor of Tehran. Previously, the position was held by Pirouz Hanachi, who held office for three years.

List

Pre-1979

Mayors appointed by Interior Minister

Mayors elected by City Association

Post-1979

Mayors appointed by Interior Minister

Mayors elected by City Council

See also

 List of mayors of Shiraz
 List of mayors of Tabriz
 List of members of City Council of Tehran
 Politics of Tehran
 Timeline of Tehran

References

Tehran
Mayors